Legion of the Lost is an autobiographical novel by Jaime Salazar. It was published in the United States by Berkley Books, an imprint of Penguin Group, on August 2, 2005. It is based on Salazar's experience as an American in the French Foreign Legion; he enlisted in 1999 before deserting less than a year later.

Reception
New York Times reviewer William Grimes described the novel as an "improbable, very funny tale." "Salazar," Grimes wrote, "has a sly, sardonic sense of humor and a gift for understatement".

References

2005 American novels
American autobiographical novels
Military autobiographies
Novels set in France
Berkley Books books